Youth of the Rally of the Togolese People (in French: Jeunesse du Rassemblement du Peuple Togolais) was the youth wing of the dominant political party in Togo, the Rally of the Togolese People (RPT). JRPT was founded in 1972.

Youth wings of political parties in Togo
Youth organisations based in Togo

Youth organizations established in 1972